Keivan Zarineh (born 26 May 1985) is a former Italian-Iranian professional footballer.

Club career
Son of Iranian parents living in Rome, he started his career with Juventus' youth sector before being loaned to a number of minor Serie C2 and Serie D teams. In 2005, after his contract with Juventus expired, he signed for Serie C2 club Rieti.

After the club was relegated to Serie D in 2006–07, he was signed by A.S. Roma on a 4-year contract, which he stated to be his favourite team. On 9 August 2007, he was loaned to Serie C2 club Cisco Roma.

After played only eight games, with a single goal, he was loaned him to Lega Pro Seconda Divisione club Valle del Giovenco., with option to purchase. On 29 January 2009 he left Valle del Giovenco to accept another loan deal, this time at Lega Pro Prima Divisione club Paganese.

In 2012, he announced his retirement after having undergone two ankle operations, stating his difficulties in finding a professional contract as the main reason, and switched into a small job as a movie distribution officer.

References

External links
 AIC profile (data by football.it) 

Living people
1985 births
Footballers from Rome
Italian footballers
Italian people of Iranian descent
Iranian expatriate footballers
Association football forwards
Juventus F.C. players
A.S. Roma players
Latina Calcio 1932 players
Atletico Roma F.C. players
Pol. Monterotondo Lupa players
Sportspeople of Iranian descent